Johndale Edward Carty (born August 27, 1977) is a former American football defensive back who played four seasons with the Atlanta Falcons of the National Football League (NFL). He was drafted by the Atlanta Falcons in the fourth round of the 1999 NFL Draft. He played college football at Utah State University and attended Hialeah-Miami Lakes High School in Hialeah, Florida. Carty was also a member of the Jacksonville Jaguars.

Professional career

Atlanta Falcons
Carty was selected by the Atlanta Falcons in the fourth round with the 126th overall pick in the 1999 NFL Draft. He played in 61 games for the Falcons from 1999 to 2002. He was released by the team on May 16, 2003.

Jacksonville Jaguars
Carty signed with the Jacksonville Jaguars on May 28, 2003. He was released by the Jaguars on August 26, 2003.

References

External links
Just Sports Stats
College stats
NFL Draft Scout

Living people
1977 births
Players of American football from Miami
American football defensive backs
Utah State Aggies football players
Atlanta Falcons players
Hialeah-Miami Lakes Senior High School alumni